Franklin Township is one of eighteen townships in Allamakee County, Iowa, USA.  At the 2010 census, its population was 408.

Geography
According to the USGS, it contains five cemeteries: Bailey Plot, Cummings Plot, Hardin, Smithfield and Volney.

References

External links
 US-Counties.com
 City-Data.com

Townships in Allamakee County, Iowa
Townships in Iowa